Kyaung Thar was a Burmese boxer from Burma. He is a former multiple-time flag champion and gold medalist.

Lethwei career 
In September 1960, around 20 boxers joined other sports teams as part of a cultural mission on a trip to China. Some boxers who came back from the trip were branded as 'ပီကင်းပြန်' meaning 'returned from Beijing', including Kyaung Thar. The Burmese boxers joined a cultural mission alongside Prime Minister U Nu who was there to sign a Sino-Burmese boundary treaty with Chinese Premier Zhou Enlai.

In 1963, Kyaung Thar was featured in a January issue of Thutti Journal (The Valour). It discussed his rise in second class and a meeting with one of the divisions stars in Hla Shwe for the upcoming Independence Day event at Kennedy Island in Rangoon.

In 1964, he was featured in a lengthy article for Light of Burma. The report came from Hpa-an and once more stressed that Kyaung Thar had no competitors left in second class. He had won the second-class flag at this year's Kennedy Island event and was now seen in battles in Hpa-an at the Thay Hta Man Aung Pagoda festival which runs annually from January 26 to January 31. In the second-class final at the Pagoda festival in Hpa-an he beat successful boxer Sat Kalay in round 4 by breaking his hand. After the fight, Kyaung Thar reportedly challenged first-class boxer Sein Lone. Two other encounters with Sat Kalay are mentioned in the article: 1962 in Karen State, which ended in KO; and in 1963, at the Labour Day event in Mawlamyine, where he broke the jaw and arm of Sat Kalay.

On February 13, 1965, he took home 300 Kyats and the second-class flag at the 18th anniversary of Union Day event in Hpa-an, once again defeating Sat Kalay. That same event saw Toe Lone win the first-class flag in the twilight of his career.

A report on the Shwemawdaw Pagoda festival in Pegu from April 1st to April 8th, 1966, mentions that Kyaung Thar took part in the first-class flag tournament, and that he was last year's recipient of the second-class flag at this event. Alongside him, boxers Chit Sayar, Phyu Gyi, Phyu Lay, Shu Ma Wa, Tin Shwe, Hla Shwe, Patma Sein and Talaing Sein participated.

Titles and accomplishments 
 Tournaments
 Second-class flag champion; Shwemawdaw Pagoda festival (April 1965)
 Second-class flag champion; 18th anniversary of Union Day (February 1965)
 Second-class flag champion; Thay Hta Man Aung Pagoda festival (January (1964)
 Second-class flag champion; 16th anniversary of Independence (January 1964)
 Other accomplishments
 11-time receiver of a gold medal in competitions in and outside of Burma by 1964.

Lethwei record 

|- style="background:#cfc;"
| 1965-04-19 || Win || align="left" |  || Shwemawdaw Pagoda festival || Pegu, Burma ||  ||  || 
|- style="background:#cfc;"
| 1965-02-13 || Win || align="left" | Sat Kalay (Paingkyon) || 18th Anniversary of Union Day || Hpa-an, Burma ||  ||  || 
|- style="background:#cfc;"
| 1964-01-31 || Win || align="left" | Sat Kalay (Paingkyon) || Thay Hta Man Aung Pagoda festival || Hpa-an, Burma || TKO || 4 || 
|- style="background:#cfc;"
| 1964-01-09 || Win || align="left" |  || Independence Day, Kennedy Island || Rangoon, Burma ||  ||  ||
|- style="background:#cfc;"
| 1963-05-01 || Win || align="left" | Sat Kalay (Paingkyon) || Labour Day || Mawlamyine, Burma || TKO ||  ||
|- style="background:#fff;"
| 1963-01-07 ||  || align="left" | Hla Shwe || Independence Day, Kennedy Island || Rangoon, Burma ||  ||  ||
|- style="background:#cfc;"
| 1962-00-00 || Win || align="left" | Sat Kalay (Paingkyon) ||  || Karen State, Burma || KO ||  ||
|-

References

Burmese Lethwei practitioners